Randia aculeata, commonly known as white indigoberry or white indigo berry, is a species in the Rubiaceae. It is a shrub or small tree that grows from 2 to 6 m tall. R. aculeata is native to Florida, Bermuda, the Bahamas, elsewhere among the Caribbean islands, and also from Mexico south through Central and South America to Colombia.

References

External links 

Randia aculeata at the USDA PLANTS database.

aculeata
Plants described in 1753
Taxa named by Carl Linnaeus